Adobe Content Server is software developed by Adobe Systems to add digital rights management to e-books. It is designed to protect and distribute Adobe e-books in PDF or EPUB format through Adobe Digital Editions, or applications and devices developed using Adobe's Adobe Reader Mobile SDK, covering a wide range of tablets, smartphones, and dedicated devices.  Adobe Content Server also works in conjunction with Adobe Digital Experience Protection Technology (ADEPT), Adobe's digital rights management scheme.

See also
 Digital Library
 Public Library
 Online shopping
 Publishing
 Adobe Digital Editions

References

Content Server
Digital rights management systems